Polanski Unauthorized is a theatrically released biographical film about the life of film director Roman Polanski. It opened in Los Angeles in February 2009 and was released on DVD in July 2009.

Background
The film was financed, written and directed by Chapa with him playing the part of the film's main character. Having already done research on Polanski and becoming interested in the subject, Chapa cited an incident that gave him inspiration. He was in a coffee shop with some artists who were having an argument about Polanski with then expressing their different thoughts on him. He thought to himself that it was time for a biopic on such a controversial figure.

The film was actually made the year prior to Polanski's arrest. It premiered at the Majestic Crest Theatre in Westwood, California on April 23, 2008. David Carradine was one of the attendees.

Cast

 Damian Chapa as Roman Polanski 
 Kevin De Ridder as Young Roman Polanski 
 Thomas Druilhet as Anton LaVey / The Devil
  Brienne De Beau as Sharon Tate
 Leah Grimsson as 13-year-old girl
 Silvia Suvadová as Bula Polanski
  Christian Serritiello as Ryszard Polanski 
 Paul James Saunders as Eugene Gatowski
 Raf Menton as Nazi Soldier
 Elena Talon as Mia Farrow
 Charles Power as Frank Sinatra
 Gilbert Azafrani as Attorney Douglas Dalton
 Monica Ramon as Spanish woman
 Robert McAtee as Hugh Hefner 
 Pierre Chemaly as William A. Fraker 
 Jeff McCredie as Phil Van Natter - Detective #1
 Justin Shell as Detective # 2
 Charles Berg as Bryan Hobbs - Detective #3
 Tony Wilde as Photographer #1 
 Derek Johnson as Photographer # 2
 Kerry Winchester as Martin Ransohoff
 Anthony J. Hilder as Sharon's bodyguard
 Antoine Janssens as Nazi Soldier #2 
 Lodi Greens as Nazi Soldier #3 
 Johnny Gooding as Mob #1
 Jeff Langton as Frankie Carbo - Mob #2
 Kathy Quintiens as Raped girl
 Jeffrey Hekker as Village boy
 André Bracke as Judge
 Franasois Leemans as Gunson
 Maria De Meyer as Grandmother
 Arthur Patching as Polish farmer
 Edmund Druilhet as 1st MP   
 Johnny Muj as 2nd MP
 Adam Dunstan as Victim
 Dana Fares as Nurse Burdette
 Mario L. Metini as Attorney
 Tim Mars as Time Magazine journalist
 Kathleen Gregory as Susan Atkins 
 Brian McArdle as John Cassavetes
 Brian Brazil as Police officer
 Victor Girone as Douglas Dalton
 Madla Hruza as Wardrobe lady
 Nasia Jansen as Monica 
 Ion Muj as German soldier
 Sonya Rome as Underage hooker
 Justin Ross as Drunk

External links

 An Authorized Interview with Damian Chapa on his Polanski: Unauthorized  by Terry Keefe

References

2009 films
American biographical films
Documentary films about film directors and producers
Roman Polanski
2000s English-language films
Films directed by Damian Chapa
2000s American films